In mathematics, the complex conjugate of a complex number is the number with an equal real part and an imaginary part equal in magnitude but opposite in sign.

The product of a complex number and its conjugate is a real number:  (or  in polar coordinates).

If a root of a univariate polynomial with real coefficients is complex, then its complex conjugate is also a root.

Notation 

The second is preferred in physics, where dagger (†) is used for the conjugate transpose, as well as electrical engineering and computer engineering, where bar notation can be confused for the logical negation ("NOT") Boolean algebra symbol, while the bar notation is more common in pure mathematics.

If a complex number is represented as a  matrix, the notations are identical, and the complex conjugate corresponds to a flip along the diagonal.

Properties 

For any two complex numbers, conjugation is distributive over addition, subtraction, multiplication and division:

A complex number is equal to its complex conjugate if its imaginary part is zero, that is, if the number is real.  In other words, real numbers are the only fixed points of conjugation. 

Conjugation does not change the modulus of a complex number: 

Conjugation is an involution, that is, the conjugate of the conjugate of a complex number  is   In symbols, 

The product of a complex number with its conjugate is equal to the square of the number's modulus:  This allows easy computation of the multiplicative inverse of a complex number given in rectangular coordinates: 

Conjugation is commutative under composition with exponentiation to integer powers, with the exponential function, and with the natural logarithm for nonzero arguments:

 

If  is a polynomial with real coefficients and  then  as well. Thus, non-real roots of real polynomials occur in complex conjugate pairs (see Complex conjugate root theorem).

Even though it appears to be a well-behaved function, it is not holomorphic; it reverses orientation whereas holomorphic functions locally preserve orientation. It is bijective and compatible with the arithmetical operations, and hence is a field automorphism. As it keeps the real numbers fixed, it is an element of the Galois group of the field extension  This Galois group has only two elements:  and the identity on  Thus the only two field automorphisms of  that leave the real numbers fixed are the identity map and complex conjugation.

Use as a variable

 Real part: 
 Imaginary part: 
 Modulus (or absolute value): 
 Argument:  so 

Furthermore,  can be used to specify lines in the plane: the set

Similarly, for a fixed complex unit  the equation

determines the line through  parallel to the line through 0 and 

Generalizations

The other planar real unital algebras, dual numbers, and split-complex numbers are also analyzed using complex conjugation.

For matrices of complex numbers,  where  represents the element-by-element conjugation of  Contrast this to the property  where  represents the conjugate transpose of 

Taking the conjugate transpose (or adjoint) of complex matrices generalizes complex conjugation. Even more general is the concept of adjoint operator for operators on (possibly infinite-dimensional) complex Hilbert spaces. All this is subsumed by the *-operations of C*-algebras.

All these generalizations are multiplicative only if the factors are reversed:

Since the multiplication of planar real algebras is commutative, this reversal is not needed there.

There is also an abstract notion of conjugation for vector spaces  over the complex numbers. In this context, any antilinear map  that satisfies

  for all  and
  for all 

As the involution  is antilinear, it cannot be the identity map on 

Of course,  is a -linear transformation of  if one notes that every complex space  has a real form obtained by taking the same vectors as in the original space and restricting the scalars to be real. The above properties actually define a real structure on the complex vector space  

One example of this notion is the conjugate transpose operation of complex matrices defined above. However, on generic complex vector spaces, there is no  notion of complex conjugation.

See also

References

Footnotes

Bibliography

 Budinich, P. and Trautman, A. The Spinorial Chessboard. Springer-Verlag, 1988. . (antilinear maps are discussed in section 3.3).

Complex numbers